David Coles may refer to:
 David Coles (footballer) (born 1964), English football goalkeeping coach
 David Coles (author), science fiction writer featured in New Writings in SF 19
 David Coles (bishop) (born 1943), Anglican bishop in New Zealand
 David Coles (radio host), former host of the radio show Variety Tonight
 David G. Coles, Canadian lawyer
 David Coles, a Canadian hip hop musician, with stage name Kyprios

See also	
 John David Coles, American film and television director
 David Cole (disambiguation)